Belizean Spanish (Spanish: español beliceño) is the dialect of Spanish spoken in Belize. It is similar to Caribbean Spanish, Andalusian Spanish, and Canarian Spanish. While English is the only official language of Belize, Spanish is the common language of majority (62.8%), wherein 174,000 (43% of Belizeans) speak some variety of Spanish as a native language. Belizeans of Guatemalan, Honduran, Mexican (including Mexican Mennonites), Nicaraguan, Salvadoran (including Salvadoran Mennonites), and even Cuban descent may speak different dialects of Spanish, but since they grow up in Belize, they adopt the local accent.

History 

Spanish language came to Belize when the Treaty of Tordesillas was signed in 1494, claiming the entire western New World for Spain, including what is now Belize. Then in the mid-16th century Spanish conquistadors explored this territory, declaring it a Spanish colony incorporated into the Captaincy General of Guatemala on December 27, 1527, when it was founded. In the second half of that century it was integrated into the government of Yucatan in the Viceroyalty of New Spain.

However, few Spanish settled in the area because of the lack of the gold they'd come seeking and the strong resistance of the Maya people. The Spanish colonists living in Belize often fought against the Maya, who were affected by slavery and disease carried by the Spanish.

On 20 January 1783, shortly after the Treaty of Versailles, Britain and Spain signed a peace treaty in which Spain ceded to Britain a small part of Belize, about 1.482 km square located between the Hondo and Belize rivers. British settlers obtained a further concession. By the London Convention of 1786 Spain ceded Belize another 1.883 km square (reaching the Sibun River or Manate Laguna, south of the Belize River). The British banned teaching of Spanish in schools.

But after thousands of Maya people and mestizos were driven from the area of Bacalar during the Caste War (1847–1901), about 7000 Mexican mestizos immigrated during these years, the Kekchi emigrated from Verapaz, Guatemala, where their lands had been seized for coffee plantations and many of them enslaved in the 1870s–1880s, Mopan returned to Belize around 1886, fleeing enslavement and taxation in Petén, Mennonite Mexicans settled in the north and west of Belize after 1958 (Mexican Mennonites may have intermarried with native-born mestizos and Mexican mestizos), and thousands of undocumented migrants moved to the central and western parts of the country, including approximately 40,000 Salvadorans (including Salvadoran Mennonites), Guatemalans, Hondurans and Nicaraguans immigrated to Belize in this decade of strife in neighboring countries between 1980 and 1990, this, along with a high fertility rate, dramatically increased the number of Hispanics in Belize, causing concern over the rapid growth of the Spanish language in a country where the official language is English.

Phonology

 As in most American lowland varieties of Spanish and in southern Spain,  at the end of a syllable or before a consonant is realized typically as a glottal .
  is realized as glottal , as in several American lowland varieties and in parts of Spain.
 Intervocalic  and  show no sign of lenition to approximants, which is very unusual among Spanish dialects.
In word-final position,  will usually be either a trill, a tap or an approximant, as in the phrase "amo eterno" (eternal love).

See also 
 Hispanic and Latin Belizean

References

Sources

Central American Spanish
Languages of Belize